A Footnote to History: Eight Years of Trouble in Samoa is an 1892 historical non-fiction work by Scottish-born author Robert Louis Stevenson describing the contemporary Samoan Civil War.

Robert Louis Stevenson arrived in Samoa in 1889 and built a house at Vailima. He quickly became passionately interested, and involved, in the attendant political machinations. These involved the three great powers battling for influence in Samoa – the United States, Germany and Britain – and the political machinations of the various Samoan factions within their indigenous political system. The book covers the period from 1882 to 1892.

The book served as such a stinging protest against existing conditions that it resulted in the recall of two officials, and Stevenson for a time feared that it would result in his own deportation. When things had finally blown over he wrote to Sidney Colvin, who came from a family of distinguished colonial administrators, "I used to think meanly of the plumber; but how he shines beside the politician!"

A contemporary review of the book noted:

References

External links
 

1892 non-fiction books
Civil wars involving the states and peoples of Oceania
History of Samoa
Cassell (publisher) books
Books by Robert Louis Stevenson
1892 in Oceania